United Nations Security Council Resolution 1976, adopted unanimously on April 11, 2011, after recalling previous resolutions on the situation in Somalia, particularly resolutions 1918 (2010) and 1950 (2010), the Council decided to consider the establishment of special Somali courts to try pirates operating off the coast of the country.

The resolution was drafted by Colombia, France, Italy, Russia, Spain and Ukraine.

Observations
In the preamble of the resolution, the Security Council expressed concern over increased pirate activity and the consequences on international shipping, with acts of hostage-taking condemned. It stated that the underlying causes of piracy had to be addressed, including the building of Somalia's economy and tackling poverty. At the same time, the Council was concerned about allegations of illegal fishing and dumping of toxic waste were used by the pirates to justify criminal activities.

All countries were invited to participate in the fight against piracy; assistance was being provided by the United Nations and international organisations to strengthen the justice system in Somalia, Kenya and the Seychelles to prosecute pirates, though many were released without trial.

Acts
The resolution recognised the continuing instability in Somalia as one of the underlying causes of the piracy issue.  International organisations, including the United Nations Development Programme, were asked to assist the Somali authorities in establishing governance and rule of law over lawless areas where acts of piracy were taking place. Allegations of illegal fishing and the dumping of toxic waste had to be investigated and reported on.

Furthermore, the Council argued that the legal capacity of Somalia and countries in the region had to be increased in order to prosecute pirates, and thus it would consider the establishment of special courts to try pirates though did not state where such courts would be located.

See also
 List of United Nations Security Council Resolutions 1901 to 2000 (2009–2011)
 Piracy in Somalia
 Somali Civil War
 United Nations Convention on the Law of the Sea
 Somali Civil War (2009–present)

References

External links
 
Text of the Resolution at undocs.org

 1976
2011 in Somalia
 1976
Piracy in Somalia
April 2011 events